The West Coast Rugby Football Union, formed in 1890, is the official governing body for rugby union in the Westland County, Hokitika Borough and Greymouth Borough districts, located in the West Coast provincial region of New Zealand, and is affiliated to the New Zealand Rugby Football Union. The West Coast RFU provincial representative team, a founding member of the National Provincial Championship,  is based in Greymouth. It plays home matches at John Sturgeon Park (known as Rugby Park until 2018).

Representative rugby
The West Coast team, a semi-professional side that previously played in the second and third divisions of the National Provincial Championship, continues to compete at national provincial level in the second-tier Heartland Championship. In 2015, the team celebrated their 125th Jubilee.

West Coast in Super Rugby

West Coast is a constituent RFU of the Crusaders Super Rugby franchise, following the replacement of NPC cup qualification to the Super 10 with a franchise model by the NZRFU. West Coast joined the alliance, led by former Super 10 qualifiers Canterbury, together with the Tasman, Buller, Mid Canterbury and South Canterbury provincial football unions.

Championships
West Coast have yet to win a Provincial Championship title in any division, but have finished in the second-division top four for five seasons since the Heartland Championship era began, including finishing as Heartland Championship minor premiers in 2009 (before losing the Meads Cup Grand Final to North Otago).

National Provincial Championship placings

Ranfurly Shield
West Coast have never held the Ranfurly Shield.
West Coast's Ranfurly Shield challenges:
27-8-1932 Canterbury 5 West Coast 3 (L.T.Martyn try)
2-9-1933 Canterbury 23 West Coast 
7-9-1935 Canterbury 16 West Coast 11 (E.Pfahlert, R.R.King tries, L.T.Martyn two penalties, one conversion)
26-9-1936 Otago 30 West Coast 0
20-9-1952 Waikato 20 West Coast 6 (A.J.Lindbom two penalties)
11-9-1954 Canterbury 8 West Coast 0
24-9-1955 Canterbury 20 West Coast 11 (F.W.Gugich, R.N.Inkster tries, A.A.McNabb one penalty, one conversion)
25-8-1962 Auckland 52 West Coast 6 (T.N.McAra drop goal, J.M.Earthorne one penalty)
16-9-1972 Canterbury 47 West Coast 3 (R.Nelson one penalty)
27-7-1974 Marlborough 18 West Coast 0
29-7-1978 Manawatu 51 West Coast 10 (C.R.Skates try, A.F.Kissick two penalties)
25-8-1984 Canterbury 68 West Coast 3 (G.Cook drop goal)
4-7-2000 Waikato 99 West Coast 3 (M.Foster one penalty)

All Blacks
There have been eight players selected for the All Blacks whilst playing their club rugby in the West Coast. 
 Harry Atkinson
 Sam Bligh
 Henry Butland
 John Corbett
 Frank Freitas
 Mike Gilbert
 Ronald King
 Jack Steel

Rundle Cup
The Rundle Cup is contested by the West Coast and Buller when they meet in senior fixtures.

The Rundle Cup was donated to the West Coast provincial union during their Annual General Meeting at the Albion Hotel on 24 May 1911 by William Rundle as a trophy for West Coast v Buller matches. Rundle was a local business man in the mining industry and former player for the Grey Football Club. He later perished on the frontline in France during World War One. The first contest for the Rundle Cup was held in 1911 in Westport, and it replaced the Molloy Cup as the region’s symbol of rugby supremacy.

The first game between the two Unions occurred in 1896 and bragging rights on the Coast now come via the Rundle Cup.

Of the 37 challenge trophies contested by two provinces in New Zealand rugby it is of the longest continuous existence, it is also the second oldest provincial trophy after the Ranfurly Shield.

WILLIAM ARTHUR RUNDLE (1874–1918)

Donor of the Rundle Cup

(Written by Clive Akers)

William Rundle was born on 24 April 1874 at No Town, a small mining settlement 25 km north-east of Greymouth. His parents, Thomas and Julia Rundle were both born in Cornwall, England, and had come out to New Zealand where Thomas became the storekeeper at No Town from the 1870s. The village also had a hotel and post office. William had three brothers (T.A., C.G., and Edward James), and two sisters, Tryphena who married William Robert Moore in 1913 and lived at Mokau and later in Auckland, and a second sister whose name is unknown but she later became Mrs R.C. Heffernan and lived in Greymouth. A fourth brother, Francis Henry, died in 1892.
William and his siblings were educated at the local No Town School. When in his early teenage years William was a pupil-teacher at the school and later became a teacher at Taylorville school. In 1893, when aged 20, he was appointed headmaster at Ahaura School and remained there until retiring in 1901 to pursue his interests in mining. 
On 4 December 1899 William married Adelaine 'Ada' Mary Gough at Ahaura. There was some controversy during his term at Ahaura when parents became concerned that William was acting as a local agent for a life insurance company and they felt he wasn't focusing on his teaching duties. However, the dispute appeared to have been settled amicably. William took part in many community activities and played competition cricket with the local club.

William and Ada moved to Hokitika in 1901 and their son Francis 'Frank' was born there on 30 September 1901, followed by daughter Adelaine Mary on 15 September 1903. The children, Frank and Ada, took part in musical recitals when the family moved to Greymouth. William played rugby with the local White Star club and in later years was on the management committee of the United rugby club. He played cricket and became secretary of the Grey Cricket Association. In Greymouth William was also active in tennis, cycling and the Masonic Lodge.

In addition to his work as a Government Life Insurance Co agent William acted as secretary to several goldmining companies and was a sharebroker and mining agent. 
In September 1910 William informed the West Coast rugby union that he wished to donate a cup for competition between West Coast and Buller unions. The cup would replace the previous trophy, Molloy Cup, which West Coast now held outright. The Molloy Cup had been donated by Rev. Father Molloy, of Westport, who made the offer in September 1905. The original condition was that the trophy became the property of the winning team that won twice in succession or three times at intervals. However, it was later revised to become three times in succession or five times at intervals. The Molloy Cup results were:

1905 at Westport Drawn 3–3
1906 at Greymouth Buller won 9–3
1907 at Westport Buller won 5–3
1908 at Greymouth West Coast won 11–4
1909 at Cape Foulwind West Coast won 16–3
1910 at Greymouth West Coast won 16–0

William was 40 years old when World War I broke out in 1914 and even in 1916 when conscription was introduced he was over age for the ballots. Married men over the age of 40 and with children were exempt. He had been involved in military training in Greymouth and in July 1916 was made a temporary 2nd Lieutenant with No. 63 Company in Greymouth. However, felt he had to do his bit for his country and enlisted for service abroad. On 22 December 1916 a Hokitika resident, H.L. Michel, wrote to the Minister of Defence, Mr James Allen, seeking a favourable rank for William:

The Hon. Jas. Allen
Wellington,

When I was in Greymouth a few days ago, I learned that Mr W.A. Rundle, who is really a good and competent man, had decided to offer his services for the front although he is a married man with a family.
He has a commission in the Territorials, but his 12 months' probation does not expire until June. He has put in an application to the Group Commander, asking to be allowed to put in the balance of the probationary period at Trentham Camp to fully qualify him. I understand the application has been favourably franked by the Group Commander.
I may mention that Mr Rundle has taken a very active part in establishing a branch of the National Reserve in Greymouth and he is deservedly a popular officer.
I merely ask you to be good enough to peruse his application, and if it is not contrary to the military policy, an officer at Trentham Camp.

With kind remembrances,
Sincerely yours,
H.L. Michel (signed)

The Minister replied saying: 
'I regret to inform you that it will not be possible for Mr Rundle to proceed to Camp as an officer, and complete his twelve months period of probation there, as such action is not sanctioned by Regulations. He should, however, apply for appointment as a probationary N.C.O., and should he be successful in gaining same, he will be provided in Camp with every facility for qualifying for commissioned rank.

Yours faithfully,
(signed) J. Allen
Minister of Defence.'

Rundle went into camp on 8 February 1917 and was a corporal until being promoted to sergeant on 15 August, the day he sailed from New Zealand. William's attestation form describes him as a self-employed mining agent, 5 ft 11in tall, 76 kg, fair complexion, blue eyes and light brown hair. His service number was 46905.
There was further training in England until he crossed the channel to France on 20 March 1918. He now reverted to corporal serving in the NZ Rifle Brigade. He had a brief spell in hospital and rejoined his unit in the field on 19 April. Five days later he celebrated his 44th birthday while in the trenches. 
Corporal William Rundle's time on the Somme battlefield was brief. He was killed in action on 2 May 1918. His gravestone is at the Euston Road British Cemetery, Colincamps, Somme, France (grave reference: I.J.26)

Clubs
West Coast Rugby Football Union is made up of 7 clubs: 
 Blaketown
 Grey Valley 
 Kiwi
 Marist
 South Westland
 Wests
 Kokatahi

References

The Shield by Lindsay Knight

External links
 Official Site

New Zealand rugby union teams
New Zealand rugby union governing bodies
Sport in the West Coast, New Zealand
Sport in Greymouth
Sports organizations established in 1890
1890 establishments in New Zealand